Boneh-ye Esmail (also Romanized as Boneh-ye Esmā’īl, Boneh Esmā‘īl, and Boneh-e Esmā‘īl; also known as Esma‘īl and Ismā‘īl) is a village in Liravi-ye Shomali Rural District, in the Central District of Deylam County, Bushehr Province, Iran. At the 2006 census, its population was 458, in 99 families.

References 

Populated places in Deylam County